Survivors is a science fiction novel set in the Star Trek expanded universe. The book is by Jean Lorrah, and takes place in the Star Trek: The Next Generation era.

Plot 
The Enterprise is called in to deal with Treva, a human colony on the fringes of known space. For a time, it was thought to be a suitable candidate for Federation membership. Now it has sent a distress call because a brutal warlord has seized power and a revolution has sprung up.

Tasha Yar is sent down with the android Data. The two soon discover the situation is more complicated than originally thought. The warlord wants Federation weapons to use against the rebels and is willing to kill whomever it takes to accomplish this goal.

The novel also focuses on the unique relationship between Yar and Data and how the current situation correlates with Yar's brutal childhood.

References

External links 
 
 Survivors at Internet Archive (registration required)

1989 American novels
American science fiction novels
Novels based on Star Trek: The Next Generation